Fort Dummer was built in the winter of 1724 in what is now the Town of Brattleboro in southeastern Vermont. Today, it is notable as the first permanent European settlement in Vermont. The original site of the fort is now lost below the waters of the Connecticut River impoundment of the Vernon Dam.

Establishment
Fort Dummer was a British colonial fort built during Dummer's War by the militia of the Province of Massachusetts Bay under the command of Lieutenant Timothy Dwight in what is now the Town of Brattleboro, in southeastern Vermont. This was in the heart of one of the three main sections of the Equivalent Lands.

The fort was the first permanent European settlement in Vermont. It consisted of a 180-square foot (17 m²) wooden stockade with 12 guns manned by 55 men (43 Massachusetts militiamen and 12 Mohawk warriors). It was named after Lieutenant Governor William Dummer, who was acting governor of Massachusetts at the time of the fort's construction.

On October 11, 1724, seventy Abenakis attacked Fort Dummer and killed 3 or 4 militiamen in the only known military action involving the stockade.

Near the former site of the fort is a granite monument, which is one mile (2 km) south of the Brattleboro railway station.

Fort Dummer State Park
Fort Dummer State Park is part of the Vermont State Park system. It comprises 217 acres (878,000 m²) of forest in Brattleboro, Guilford & Vernon.

The park overlooks the former site of Fort Dummer which was flooded when the Vernon Dam was built on the Connecticut River in 1908. The granite monument that commemorates the fort is not within the borders of the park. The monument itself was moved in 1908 to prevent it from being lost after the dam was completed. The original site of the fort can be seen from the northernmost scenic vista on the Sunrise Trail within the park. It is now underwater near the lumber company located on the western bank of the river.

Campground facilities include 50 tent/trailer sites and 10 lean-to sites, toilet buildings with hot showers, and a sanitary dump station. Other facilities include a small picnic area, three short hiking trails, one of which leads to a swimming hole, and a large open field.

See also
Fort at Number 4

References

External links

Fort Dummer State Park

State parks of Vermont
Dummer
Buildings and structures in Brattleboro, Vermont
Protected areas of Windham County, Vermont
Dummer
Dummer
1724 establishments in Massachusetts
Government buildings completed in 1724
Infrastructure completed in 1724